WNGM (1340 AM) was a talk/adult standards radio station licensed to Mountain City, Georgia, United States. The station filed to be silent temporarily in April 2009.

The station's owners surrendered its license to the FCC on April 23, 2014.

The WALH callsign is now licensed to WALH-LP in Wilmington, Ohio.

External links

NGM
Radio stations established in 1966
Defunct radio stations in the United States
Radio stations disestablished in 2014
1966 establishments in Georgia (U.S. state)
2014 disestablishments in Georgia (U.S. state)
NGM